Nicholas 'Nicky' Jarvis is a male former international table tennis player from England.

Table tennis career
He represented England at three World Table Tennis Championships in the Swaythling Cup (men's team event) from 1973-1979.

He won two English National Table Tennis Championships titles. He later became the head coach of the National team and Head Performance coach & Technical Manager at the English Table Tennis Association.

Personal life
He married Linda Howard in 1979 and their son is professional footballer Matt Jarvis.

See also
 List of England players at the World Team Table Tennis Championships

References

English male table tennis players
Living people
Year of birth missing (living people)